The My Homeland Egypt Party  is an Egyptian political party that is composed of "diehards" of the Hosni Mubarak-era National Democratic Party.

Overview
The party, an independent popular movement, was formed in December 2013. Although Murad Muwafi was also in the running to be chosen as president of the party, Ahmed Gamal El Din was ultimately selected. The organization behind the party, called the Misr Baladi Front, has backed Abdel Fattah el-Sisi in the 2014 presidential race. Mustafa Bakri, an "official" in the party, has stated that the organization is currently preparing its lists for the 2015 Egyptian parliamentary election.

References

2013 establishments in Egypt
Political parties established in 2013
Egyptian nationalists
Egyptian nationalism